Keith Robert Neubert is a former professional American football tight end in the National Football League.  He played for the New York Jets (1988–1990) and the Philadelphia Eagles (1992-1993). He is also a television host, producer, writer, director, and actor.

Early life and career 
Neubert was born in Fort Atkinson, Wisconsin. He played college football and basketball for the Nebraska Cornhuskers from 1984 to 1988, earning varsity letters in both and received a communications-journalism degree. After playing four years of basketball, competing in the NCAA Tournament and NIT Final Four at Madison Square Garden during his hoops career, Keith joined the Nebraska football team as a TE for his senior season. After playing just one year of football, he was drafted by the NFL's New York Jets.

Football 

Drafted by the New York Jets, he played in the NFL for five years until he was injured in 1992.

Television and film
As an actor, he debuted in the lead role in the Italian western Trinity comedy series sequel, Sons of Trinity. He appeared in secondary roles in That Thing You Do! and in The Drew Carey Show, Becker, The Closer, Wings, Bittersweet and had recurring roles on Baywatch and Two Guys and a Girl.

Neubert was the host of the History Channel's competition reality series, Picked Off.  He hosts National Geographic International's television series Expedition China: Search for Shangri la which airs on Discovery Plus Network (US) and PBS (US). Keith is currently producing the reality series "Battle Dogs" airing on Discovery Channel, Apple TV  and Verizon  and he is also the host, producer, and writer on the American Xplorer adventure series for HDNet and host of Man Kitchen for the Food Network's Food2 Channel and The Cooking Channel.

Neubert is credited as a producer, writer, and director on many television series and documentary films, including Battle Dogs on Discovery Channel"American Xplorer", "Expedition China: Search for Shangri la", "With Love and Respect: Vince Lombardi's Green Bay Packers", Extreme Rescue: Passage to Freedom and FX Network's The Pit,

References 

1964 births
Living people
People from Fort Atkinson, Wisconsin
Players of American football from Wisconsin
American football tight ends
Nebraska Cornhuskers football players
Nebraska Cornhuskers men's basketball players
New York Jets players
American male actors
American men's basketball players